Chang Juu-en (born 1951) is a Taiwanese engineer who served as Minister of the Environmental Protection Administration from 2003 to 2005.

Early life and academic career
Chang was born in 1951 and raised on a farm in Taiwan. He earned a Ph.D in civil engineering from Tohoku University in Japan, after having studied at Taiwan's National Cheng Kung University (NCKU). Chang began teaching at NCKU in 1982, and was named deputy minister of the Environmental Protection Administration under the leadership of Hau Lung-pin in April 2001.

Environmental Protection Administration
Hau Lung-pin resigned from the Environmental Protection Administration on 1 October 2003, due to a disagreement on whether to implement referendum results despite concerns raised in a professional environmental impact assessment. Premier Yu Shyi-kun appointed Chang Juu-en to succeed Hau in an acting capacity after accepting Hau's resignation on 5 October.

Upon taking office, Chang pushed the government to build more incinerators, a recommendation that incited severe backlash across Taiwan. He made attempts to regulate the recycling of e-waste. Chang was criticized in 2004 for proposing an expensive three-year action plan during an election year, as it was not a guarantee that he would be retained. However, he kept his post after the election, and worked to clean the Fengshan River. Chang resigned in April 2005 and returned to teaching at 
National Cheng Kung University.

References

1951 births
Living people
National Cheng Kung University alumni
Academic staff of the National Cheng Kung University
Tohoku University alumni
Taiwanese civil engineers
Taiwanese Ministers of Environment
Politicians of the Republic of China on Taiwan from Changhua County